Pine Hill is a town in Wilcox County, Alabama,  United States. It incorporated in 1895. Per the 2020 census, the population was 758.

Geography
Pine Hill is located at  (31.986332, -87.592131).

Demographics

2020 census

Note: the US Census treats Hispanic/Latino as an ethnic category. This table excludes Latinos from the racial categories and assigns them to a separate category. Hispanics/Latinos can be of any race.

2000 Census
At the 2000 census there were 966 people, 391 households, and 272 families in the town. The racial makeup of the town was 49.90% Black or African American, 48.96% White, 0.72% Native American, 0.10% Asian, and 0.31% from two or more races. 0.10% of the population were Hispanic or Latino of any race.
Of the 391 households 36.6% had children under the age of 18 living with them, 41.4% were married couples living together, 25.8% had a female householder with no husband present, and 30.2% were non-families. 27.9% of households were one person and 11.8% were one person aged 65 or older. The average household size was 2.47 and the average family size was 3.01.

The age distribution was 30.8% under the age of 18, 9.0% from 18 to 24, 24.1% from 25 to 44, 22.7% from 45 to 64, and 13.4% 65 or older. The median age was 34 years. For every 100 females, there were 87.9 males. For every 100 females age 18 and over, there were 78.6 males.

The median household income was $23,375 and the median family income  was $32,813. Males had a median income of $32,368 versus $17,396 for females. The per capita income for the town was $15,845. About 28.3% of families and 30.9% of the population were below the poverty line, including 49.5% of those under age 18 and 21.0% of those age 65 or over.

References

Towns in Wilcox County, Alabama
Towns in Alabama